Ghinzu is a Belgian alternative rock band founded in 1999 in Brussels.

Lineup
John Israel (also known as John Stargasm) (voice, keyboards), full name John-David Simon Israel
Mika "Nagazaki" Hasson (bass), full name Michael Salvatore Hasson
Greg Remy (guitar & Weird things), full name Gregory Philip N. Remy
Jean Waterlot (guitar, Keys), full name Jean Lucien Louis Waterlot
Antoine Michel (drums)

Past members 
 Sanderson Poe (upright bass, backing vocals)
 Fabrice George (drums)
 Kris Dane (keyboards, guitar, backing vocals)

History

Electronic Jacuzzi (2000)

The band released its first album, Electronic Jacuzzi in late 2000 on their own label Dragoon. Their sound is a kind of noisy rock, supported by a big and groovy rhythmic and some electronic touches while their subject matters are, among others, sex, partying, and drugs. The album was only released in Belgium and sold enough at least to make another one.

Blow (2004-2008)

Their second LP, Blow, was released in February 2004 in Belgium. Things started to take off for Ghinzu at that time, with a sold-out gig at the Ancienne Belgique in Brussels with fellow bands Girls in Hawaii and Sharko and an album release in France, Switzerland, Germany and Scandinavia in September. Blow was a success, especially in Belgium and France where the single "Do You Read Me?" became a hit. In June 2005, Ghinzu sold out the mythic Olympia music hall in Paris, followed by concerts around Europe. They also played with Iggy & The Stooges in a Festival in France, Iggy Pop telling them after their gig: "You guys rock!". In the end, about 100,000 copies of Blow were sold across Europe.

In November 2005, due to popular demand, their first album was re-issued with a different track listing.

In 2006, the band wrote and recorded the soundtrack for the movie Irina Palm (directed by Sam Garbarski and starring Marianne Faithfull) which received a critical success at the Berlin Film Festival in February 2007. More collaborations with cinema were to follow. In 2006, their song "Blow" was used as closing track for the movie Ex Drummer, by Koen Mortier (based on a novel by Belgian writer Herman Brusselmans). Ghinzu songs also appear in Sky Fighters and Dikkenek.

Their song "The Dragster-Wave" from the album Blow, was used over the end credits of the 2008 movie Taken, as well as featuring in the film's trailer. The movie was a success in America and around the world, which allowed Ghinzu to reach a wider audience.

Mirror Mirror (2009-Present)

Ghinzu's third album, entitled Mirror Mirror, was released on March 30, 2009, in Benelux, France and Switzerland. Mirror Mirror has been recorded during the previous two years in an office building in Brussels. It was then mixed in London by Klaxons and Libertines collaborator Nick Terry. Musically, the record has a wider and more direct sound than Blow. It also takes a more operatic rock approach, sometimes gathering together several songs into one same musical movement (as with "Mother Allegra", "Mirror Mirror" and "The Dream Maker" or with the three final tunes of the album).

The band started to tour Europe in spring 2009, playing several dates in France with Placebo as well as big summer festivals such as Rock Werchter, Eurockéennes and Paleo Festival. In October 2009, Ghinzu played at Le Zénith in Paris for the first time and in February 2010, the band played Forest National, the biggest venue in their hometown of Brussels. The band also opened for Muse in Nijmegen, Netherlands, during their Stadium Summer Tour, on June 19, 2010.

Mirror Mirror was then released internationally during summer 2010. On December 6, 2010, an EP of remixes of songs on Mirror Mirror was digitally released under the name The Mirror Mirror Remix EP.

On March 2, 2011, John Stargasm announced on his Twitter account that Ghinzu was working on a new album. A couple of dates in France have been booked for spring.

Discography 
 Electronic Jacuzzi (2000/ Reissued in 2005)
Blow (2004)
Mirror Mirror (2009)

Charts

Notes

External links
www.ghinzu.com: official site
www.myspace.com/ghinzu

Belgian rock music groups
Belgian pop music groups